Severe Tropical Cyclone Paula was a tropical cyclone which caused extensive damage to areas of Vanuatu. The cyclone was the second cyclone and only severe tropical cyclone of the relatively inactive 2000–01 South Pacific cyclone season. Cyclone Paula developed from an area of disturbed weather embedded within a monsoon trough on February 25, 2001, near Vanuatu. Situated in an area of favorable conditions, Paula steadily intensified as it moved in a general direction towards the southeast. However, the cyclone began to accelerate further to the southeast into more unfavorable conditions. As a result, Paula quickly weakened, and thus degenerated into an extratropical cyclone on March 4.

Meteorological history

At the time, the system was positioned under an upper-level outflow center and located in an area of warm sea surface temperatures (SSTs) of about 30 °C (86 °F). Early the next day, a sharp increase in oceanic heat content triggered a rapid burst of convection in the northern and eastern quadrants of the system. Associated rainbands also began to increasingly curve toward the circulation center of the low pressure area. An expanding circulation center and persistently deep convection allowed barometric pressures within the system to steadily fall. QuikSCAT and SSM/I data indicated that winds of gale force were persisting in northeastern areas of the system. As a result, the storm system was upgraded to cyclone status and was given the name Paula at 1200 UTC on February 26 by the Regional Specialized Meteorological Center in Nadi, Fiji (RSMC Nadi). The Joint Typhoon Warning Center (JTWC) also began to track the system, issuing its first cyclone warning on the same day at 1500 UTC, noting at the cyclone's persistent deep convection.

In an area of weak steering currents, Paula began to move in a small, clockwise loop. After completing its small cyclonic loop, the cyclone developed a small central dense overcast (CDO), containing a ragged eye. Throughout the day the eye became increasingly better defined as the cyclone accelerated towards the southeast. After passing Vanuatu, Paula moved towards Fiji, quickly passing the island to the south.

After passing to the south of Fiji, Cyclone Paula quickly accelerated into an area of strong vertical wind shear, due to a strong northwesterly wind current. The JTWC subsequently issued their final warning on the system at 1200 UTC, later that day.

Preparations and impact

Vanuatu
As Cyclone Paula threatened Vanuatu, RSMC Nadi issued a total of 14 special advisories for the island chain at six–hour intervals, beginning at 2344 UTC on February 25, and ending at 0230 UTC on March 1. In the Port Vila area, an estimated 100 families were evacuated from potentially flood-prone areas.

The cyclone caused heavy rainfall and flooding across Vanuatu. Areas in the western parts of Espiritu Santo experienced damage due to strong winds and flooding in low-lying areas due to Cyclone Paula, forcing the evacuation of communities to higher ground. Trees were also uprooted, causing damage to communication lines and resulting in power outages. An estimated 45–50% of all houses and gardens in Vanuatu were reported to have been damaged by the cyclone, as well as 25% of other infrastructure. A 19-year-old boy drowned in floodwaters caused by Paula after trying to get his canoe to safety.

Fiji
In Fiji's Western Division, strong storm surge destroyed homes in nine villages across the coastline. Root crops, fruit trees, and sugar cane fields were damaged due to Paula. Strong rains also resulted in minor landslides and road closures. One fatality resulted from Cyclone Paula in Fiji.

See also

Other storms of the same name

References

External links

Bureau of Meteorology

2000–01 Australian region cyclone season
Tropical cyclones in Vanuatu
Tropical cyclones in Fiji
Retired South Pacific cyclones
Category 4 South Pacific cyclones
Paula